ECSA may refer to:

 Edinburgh College Students' Association 
 Editorial Complutense 
 Electoral Commission of South Australia 
 Electrochemical active surface area 
 Engineering Council of South Africa 
 European Citizen Science Association
 European Composer and Songwriter Alliance
 European Community Shipowners' Associations